A sleeper wall may refer to the following types of walls:
sleeper wall is a  short wall used to support floor joists, beam and block or hollowcore slabs at ground floor. It is constructed in this fashion when a suspended floor(Also called suspended slab) is required due to bearing conditions or ground water presence. Essentially it is a wall in the way that it is constructed but a sleeper in the way that it functions.Stretcher bond or header-stretcher bond can be used in these walls.

sleeper wall  can also refer to a retaining wall made from railroad ties. It is used to prevent erosion. It can be made from bricks or concrete blocks. The wall is often used in landscaping.

References

Structural system
Types of wall